The 2012 Pan-American Volleyball Cup was the seventh edition of the annual men's volleyball tournament, played by eight countries over July, 2012 in Santo Domingo, Dominican Republic. The event served as a qualifier for the 2013 FIVB Volleyball World League qualification.

United States won the tournament for the fifth time after beating Argentina 3–0 in the final.

Dominican Republic earned the right to play in the 2013 FIVB Volleyball World League qualification finishing third after United States and Argentina who are already qualified to the 2013 FIVB Volleyball World League

Competing nations

Squads

Pool standing procedure
Match won 3–0: 5 points for the winner, 0 point for the loser
Match won 3–1: 4 points for the winner, 1 points for the loser
Match won 3–2: 3 points for the winner, 2 points for the loser
In case of tie, the teams were classified according to the following criteria:
points ratio and sets ratio

Preliminary round
Venue:  Palacio del Voleibol, Santo Domingo, Dominican Republic
All times are Atlantic Time Zone (UTC−04:00).

Group A

Group B

Final round

Championship bracket

5th–8th places bracket

Quarterfinals

Classification 5–8

Semifinals

Classification 7–8

Classification 5–6

Classification 3–4

Final

Final standing

Dominican Republic qualified for the 2013 FIVB Volleyball World League qualification.

Awards
MVP:  Taylor Sander
Best Scorer:  José Miguel Cáceres
Best Spiker:  Antonio Ciarelli
Best Blocker:  Marc-Anthony Honoré
Best Server:  Elvis Contreras
Best Digger:  Dustin Watten
Best Setter:  Pedro Rangel
Best Receiver:  Elvis Contreras
Best Libero:  Edwin Peguero

References

Men's Pan-American Volleyball Cup
Men's Pan-American Volleyball Cup
Men's Pan-American Volleyball Cup
2012 Men's Pan-American Volleyball Cup